Thomas Phelpes (fl. 1386) of Wells, Somerset, was an English politician.

Career
He was a Member (MP) of the Parliament of England for Wells in 1386.

References

Year of birth missing
Year of death missing
English MPs 1386
People from Somerset